Estakhr (also known as Estakhr-e ‘Olyā) is a village in Kuhestan Rural District, Rostaq District, Darab County, Fars Province, Iran. At the 2006 census, its population was 148, in 33 families.

References 

Populated places in Darab County